Concord New Energy Group Limited is an investment holding company and is listed on the Hong Kong stock exchange with its Hong Kong headquarters at Admiralty, Hong Kong. The company had a management office in Beijing. The Company and its subsidiaries are engaged in engineering, procurement and construction (EPC), operation and maintenance of wind power plants, the manufacture of wind power equipment and other wind power related business. The listed company and its predecessor, had a few former names: Nam Pei Hong (Holding) Limited, Nam Pei Hong International Holdings Limited, N P H International Holdings Limited, Hong Kong Pharmaceutical Holdings Limited and most recently China Windpower Group Limited.

History
It was previously known as "N P H International Holdings Limited" from 1997 to 2000, as well as Nam Pei Hong International Holdings Limited in 1997. From 2007 to 2015, the listed company was known as China WindPower Group Limited.

Nam Pei Hong International
Nam Pei Hong International Holdings was a Bermuda-incorporated offshore company. Nam Pak Hong was a kind of trading company that import and export goods from China. Bonham Strand was also nicknamed "Nam Pak Hong street" in Chinese language. However, the listed company did not headquartered in Bonham Strand, also did not own any properties on that street. However, the listed company was the parent company of Nam Pei Hong Sum Yung Drugs Company Limited, a trading company in Chinese medicine such as dried abalone, birds' nests, dried scallops, ginseng, etc.

Before 1997, the business was incorporated and listed in Hong Kong as Nam Pei Hong (Holding) Limited. It was incorporated in 1984 and listed on 27 November 1991. Soon after the Hong Kong incorporated holding company, Nam Pei Hong (Holding), became a subsidiary of the Bermuda-incorporated new holding company in 1997, it was renamed to Foster (Group) Limited from 1998 to 2000. As of 31 March 2006, it was still a wholly owned subsidiary of the group. However, after the listed company became an investment vehicle for a backdoor listing, the Nam Pei Hong division was sold to Johnson Ko, one of the shareholder of the listed company in 2009, for HK$34 million. Nam Pei Hong (Holding) was dissolved by striking-off in 2010. However, as of 2019, the former subsidiaries, Nam Pei Hong Sum Yung Drugs and N P H Sino-Meditech Limited, were live companies.

Hong Kong Pharmaceutical
It was reported that Heilongjiang Economic Development Corp. acquired the controlling stake of the listed company in 1996. The Hong Kong stock exchange also publicly criticised the listed company and former managers for failing to disclose the sale of the company in time. According to a press release, Yau transferred the stake of Victory Hunter Holdings to Hong Tau Investment in 1999 for HK$1. 2 directors of the listed company, Sun Hiu-lu and Chu Kwan, via Welcome Success Worldwide Limited, owned 51% stake of Hong Tau, however, themselves did not have "a casting vote or control of Welcome Success Worldwide". The remaining 49% stake of Hong Tau were owned by Heilongjiang Economic Development (which was later renamed to Heilongjiang China United Co., Ltd.) and another government-owned company Heilongjian International Trust Investment Corporation. According to the last publication before 2004 suspension, as at 30 September 2003, Hong Tau still owned a majority stake (67.2%) of the listed company It was reported that Sun acquired the aforementioned stake from Yau in 1999, also caused a price fluctuation of the shares of the listed company.

The listed company was renamed to Hong Kong Pharmaceutical Holdings Limited in 2000. The listed company acquired several Mainland China based businesses.

However, the poor management under new owner(s), had caused the listed company in the brink of liquidation in 2004.

In 2005,  acquired the controlling stake (85.2%) of the listed company from the liquidator. The listed company also sold two Mainland-incorporated subsidiaries to the bond holders. The listed company also said to be refocus on Nam Pak Hong trading business, despite the division was sold to Ko in 2009. Johnson Ko was the chairman of the company from 2006 until 2009, which his position was changed to vice-chairman in June 2009. After a reverse IPO in 2007, Johnson Ko was still one of the major shareholders of the company until 2015. In May 2015, he sold most of his shareholding (held via a company he owned: Gain Alpha) of Concord New Energy, which was decreased from 22.36% to 2.24% of the share capital. Johnson Ko and his daughter  were resigned as directors of the company in June 2015.

In December 2006, the listed company was resumed from trading after more than 2 years of suspension. The closing price was HK$0.47 per share, or a decrease of HK$1.47 in magnitude.

China WindPower Group
In April 2007 Hong Kong Pharmaceutical acquired China Wind Power Holdings Limited as a reverse IPO. The listed company also renamed to China WindPower Group Limited (upper cap "P") after the deal. The listed company also owned a subsidiary that known as "China Windpower Group Limited" until 2009. China Windpower (lower cap "p") was sold to Johnson Ko, which China Windpower (lower cap "p") was the direct parent company of Nam Pei Hong Sum Yung Drugs business (see above section #Nam Pei Hong International for the details).

The company and its subsidiaries were engaged in engineering, procurement and construction (EPC), operation and maintenance of wind power plants, the manufacture of wind power equipment and other wind power related business.

In 2009, fellow listed company CLP Group acquired 50% stake of a subsidiary of China WindPower Group for HK$101.3 million. The joint venture and former subsidiary, CLP-CWP Wind Power Investment Limited, owned wind farms in Fuxin, Liaoning Province, China.

Concord New Energy
In 2015, the listed company was renamed to Concord New Energy Group Limited. According to the press release, since the company had acquired solar farm in 2011, the company's newly installed power generating capacity had been mainly from solar power since 2014, thus renaming the company.

In November 2017, the company suspended the issuance of its bond. The public offering of the bond was resumed in January 2018. In 2017, Fitch Ratings assigned a "BB-" rating to the company.

In 2018, Concord New Energy was part of the consortium to provide venture funding to Malta Inc., a spin off of Alphabet Inc.

References

External links

 

Companies listed on the Hong Kong Stock Exchange
Wind power companies of China
Pharmaceutical companies of Hong Kong
Holding companies of Hong Kong
Trading companies of Hong Kong
1984 establishments in Hong Kong
1997 establishments in Bermuda
Offshore companies of Bermuda
Engineering companies of China
Hong Kong brands